The Chevrolet Gemini small-block engine is a dual-overhead cam (DOHC) V8 engine designed by General Motors. While technically a small-block engine due to its bore spacing of 4.4 inches, General Motors engineers don't consider it to be a part of the traditional Chevrolet small block lineage because of the substantial reworking, specialized development, and unique technical features distinguishing its design. 

The LT6 is a clean-sheet design, mechanically unrelated to both the LS-based engines and the Cadillac Blackwing V8. Its most notable traits include a flat-plane crankshaft and dual-overhead camshafts, which represents a departure from the traditional pushrod valves and crossplane crankshafts found in all previous generations of Chevrolet small-block engines. As of February 2023, the Gemini engine has only one variant, dubbed LT6. Though nothing has been formally announced, there are rumors a twin-turbo variant is in the works. This engine, to be known as the LT7 if it comes to fruition, would power upcoming ZR1 and Zora versions of the C8 Corvette.

LT6 
The LT6 is a 5.5-liter, naturally-aspirated V8 engine. It debuted in the eighth-generation Corvette Z06, and was unveiled on October 26, 2021. 

These figures make it the most powerful naturally-aspirated production V8 engine of all time; the engine to previously hold this title, the Mercedes-Benz SLS AMG Black Series M159 6.2-liter V8, made  at 7,400 RPM.  

The LT6 is also the largest flat-plane V8 used in a production car by displacement, dethroning the Ford Voodoo. This is notable due to the additional vibrations inherent to this architecture compared to a crossplane V8, which tend to scale up with displacement. 

A modified version of the LT6 has powered the C8.R since 2019, and many features in the racing engine carry over to the road engine. Other notable LT6 features include a cast aluminum block, dual coil valve springs supporting titanium intake & sodium filled exhaust valves, forged aluminum pistons, forged titanium connecting rods, active split intake manifold with twin 87mm throttle bodies, four-into-two-into-one stainless steel exhaust headers, and a factory six-stage 10-quart dry sump oiling system with individual crank bay scavenging.

Applications:

See also 
 Chevrolet small-block engine
 General Motors LS-based small-block engine
 List of GM engines

References 

Chevrolet engines
V8 engines
Gasoline engines by model
Engines by model